Zoltán Remák (born 15 January 1977 in Košice) is a Slovak former cyclist of Hungarian nationality.

Major results

2003
1st Overall Tour de Hongrie
1st Stage 1
2004
1st Overall Grand Prix Cycliste de Gemenc
1st Overall Tour de Hongrie
2005
1st Prologue Tour de Hongrie
5th Overall Paths of King Nikola
2006
2nd  National Road Race Championships
2nd  National Time Trial Championships
2nd Overall Tour de Hongrie
2nd Tour of Vojvodina I
2007
1st Overall Tour of Szeklerland
1st Stage 1
1st Overall International Paths of Victory Tour
1st Stage 4

References

1977 births
Living people
Slovak male cyclists
Sportspeople from Košice